The Dhaulagiri massif in Nepal extends  from the Kaligandaki River west to the Bheri. This massif is bounded on the north and southwest by tributaries of the Bheri River and on the southeast by the Myagdi Khola.

Toponymy 
Dhaulagiri (धौलागिरी) is the Nepali name for the mountain which comes from Sanskrit where धवल (dhawala) means dazzling, white, beautiful and गिरि (giri) means mountain.

Peaks 

‡ The status of Churen Himal's three peaks is unclear and sources differ on their heights. The coordinates, heights and prominence values above are derived from the Finnmap. The first ascent data is from Neate, but it is unclear if the first ascent of Churen Himal East was actually an ascent of the highest of the three peaks, as Neate lists Churen Himal Central as a 7,320 m subpeak of Churen Himal East.

Most of the named 7,000-metre peaks are on a ridge extending WNW, separated from Dhaulagiri I by 5,355m French Pass at 28°46'55"N, 83°31'54"E. In order they are Dhaulagiri II, III, V, IV, Junction Peak, Churens East, Central and West, Putha Hiunchuli and Hiunchuli Patan.  False Junction Peak, Dhaulagiri VI and Gurja are on a ridge extending south from Junction Peak. The British Alpine Club's Himalayan Index lists 37 more peaks over 6,000 m.

6,182m Pota Himal (FinnMap sheet 2883-01 "Chhedhul Gumba") stands north of the main ridge between Churen and Putha Hiunchuli.  Pota has been informally renamed Peak Hawley after Elizabeth Hawley, a notable expedition chronicler and Kathmandu-based reporter.

Hiunchuli Patan at the western end nearest the Bheri River is locally called Sisne or Murkatta Himal.  It was an iconic landmark to insurgents based in Rukum and Rolpa districts during the 1996–2006 Nepal Civil War.

Climbing history 

 1954 – J. O. M. Roberts and Ang Nyima Sherpa climb Putha Hiunchuli, the first major summit ascent in the range.
 1955 – Dh.II attempted by J. O. M. Roberts and others
 1959

 Pre-monsoon and post-monsoon reconnaissances of Dh.II by Japanese expeditions.
 Hangde 6556m in Mukut section attempted.

 1962

 Churen attempt from north by Japanese Nihon University expedition.  Climbed Hangde (~6600m), Tongu (~6250m), P6265 during approach/acclimation through Hidden Valley; also Kantokal (~6500m) north of Putha Hiunchili.
 Churen and Dh.VI attempt from south by J. O. M. Roberts, thinking he was on Dh.IV due to inaccurate maps.  Climbed a lower peak (6,529m) near Gurja, naming it Ghustang after the stream draining the cirque they climbed in.

 1963

 Dh.II attempt by Austrian expedition, reaching 7,000m
 Dh.III attempt

 1965

 Japanese expedition to Dh.II delayed two months by heavy snow in approach passes.  Lost two porters to avalanche, then another porter was injured in a fall and needed evacuation.  This left too little food to continue.
 J. O. M. Roberts leads British R.A.F. expedition to Dh.VI, still believing it was Dh.IV.  Defeated by late monsoon, then early winter storms creating excessive avalanche risk.

 1969

 Dh.IV attempt by Austrian Alpine Club.  Five Austrians and one Nepali disappear, may have summited.
 Gurja climbed by Japanese expedition.
 First authorized ascents of Tukuche 6920m and Tukuche West 6800m.

 1970

 Japan's Kansai Mountaineering Club unsuccessful on Dh.IV in April but climbed Dh.VI and False Junction Peak.
 Korean expedition claims they summited Churen East on 29 April.  Questioned by same year Japanese expedition, see next.
 Japanese expedition climbs Churen Central and Churen West on 24 October.

 1971

 First ascent of Dh.II on 18 May by Austrian expedition.
 Dh.IV attempt
 Dh.V attempted by pre- and post-monsoon Japanese expeditions.  Both ended by fatal accidents.

 1972 – Dh.IV attempted twice by Japanese expeditions. First attempt abandoned when a climber fell ill and died at 6200m.  Second expedition climbed via crest from west, found route too long at high elevation (7,000m+).  Climbed Dh.VI and Junction Peak.

 1973

 first ascent of Dh.III on 20 October by German expedition.
 Dh.IV attempted by Austrians who reached 7250m on N face, then by British who quit after two deaths.

 1974

 Dh.IV attempt by British R.A.F. expedition abandoned after three Sherpas killed by falling ice.
 In Mukut section: ascents of Parbat Rinchen 6200m, Parbat Talpari 6248m, West Himparkhal 6248m, East Himparkhal 6227m, Tashi Kang III 6157m

 1975

 Dh.IV climbed 9 May by S. Kawazu and E. Yusuda, who died on descent, bringing death toll on Dh.IV to 14. (Compared with 13 deaths on Mount Everest before it was successfully climbed in 1953.) Another Japanese expedition in October puts ten on summit without loss of life.
 Dh.V climbed by M. Morioka and Pembu Tsering Sherpa on Japanese expedition.

 1979 – Japanese traverse Dh.II, III and V along 7,150m+ crest.  Expedition led by a woman.
 2008 – First ascent of Peak Hawley (AKA Pota Himal; named after Elizabeth Hawley).  Solo climb by François Damilano following expedition climb of Putha Hiunchuli.
 2013 – First ascent of Hiunchuli Patan (known locally as Sisne or Murkatta Himal).  Nepalese expedition led by Man Bahadur Khatri.

References

Mountain ranges of Nepal